Paweł Pawlak (born February 8, 1989) is a Polish mixed martial artist currently competing in the Middleweight division of Konfrontacja Sztuk Walki (KSW). He is currently ranked #1 in the KSW Middleweight rankings. A professional since 2010, he has also fought in the UFC and Absolute Championship Akhmat.

Mixed martial arts career

Early career
Pawlak made his professional MMA debut in May 2010 in his native Poland.  During the first three and a half years of his career, he amassed an undefeated record of ten wins, with all but one win coming by way of TKO or submission.

Ultimate Fighting Championship
Pawlak signed with the UFC in late 2013.  He made his debut against Peter Sobotta at UFC Fight Night 41 on May 31, 2014. Pawlak lost the fight by unanimous decision.

In his second fight for the promotion, Pawlak faced Sheldon Westcott at UFC Fight Night: Gonzaga vs. Cro Cop 2 on April 11, 2015.  He won the fight via unanimous decision.

Pawlak then faced Leon Edwards at UFC Fight Night 72. He lost the fight via unanimous decision and was subsequently released from the promotion.

Post-UFC career
After the UFC stint, Pawlak has mainly competed in his native Poland and eventually fought for the vacant Babilon MMA Middleweight Championship against Adrian Błeszyński at Babilon 12 on February 7, 2020. The bout ended in a split draw.

After knocking out Filip Tomczak at Babilon 14, Pawlak proceeded to fight again for the vacant Middleweight Championship in a rematch against Adrian Błeszyński at Babilon 18 on November 27, 2020. He won the fight and claimed the title via unanimous decision.

Pawlak made his first title defense against Sergey Guzev at Babilon 21 on April 30, 2021. He successfully defended the championship via unanimous decision.

KSW 
Pawlak faced Greco-Roman Olympic bronze medalist wrestler Damian Janikowski on September 4, 2021 at KSW 63: Crime of The Century. He won the bout via unanimous decision.

Pawlak faced Cezary Kęsik at KSW 69: Przybysz vs. Martins on April 23, 2022. He won the bout via split decision.

Pawlak faced Tom Breese on November 12, 2022 at KSW 76: Parnasse vs. Rajewski, winning the bout via ground and pound TKO in the first round.

Championships and accomplishments
Babilon MMA 
BAB Middleweight Championship (One time; one title defense)

Mixed martial arts record

|-
|Win
|align=center|21–4–1
|Tom Breese
|TKO (elbow and punches)
|KSW 76: Parnasse vs. Rajewski
|
|align=center|1
|align=center|3:54
|Grodzisk Mazowiecki, Poland
| 
|-
| Win
| align=center|20–4–1
| Cezary Kęsik
| Decision (split)
| KSW 69: Przybysz vs. Martins
| 
| align=center|3
| align=center|5:00
|Warszawa, Poland
| 
|-
| Win
| align=center| 19–4–1
| Damian Janikowski
| Decision (unanimous)
| KSW 63: Crime of The Century
|
| align=center| 3
| align=center| 5:00
|Warszawa, Poland
| 
|-
| Win
| align=center| 18–4–1
| Sergey Guzev
| Decision (unanimous)
| Babilon MMA 21: Pawlak vs. Guzev
| 
| align=center| 5
| align=center| 5:00
| Warsaw, Poland
|
|-
| Win
| align=center| 17–4–1
| Adrian Błeszyński
| Decision (unanimous)
| Babilon MMA 18: Revenge
| 
| align=center| 5
| align=center| 5:00
| Łódź, Poland
| 
|-
| Win
| align=center| 16–4–1
| Filip Tomczak
| TKO (punches)
| Babilon MMA 14: Pawlak vs. Tomczak
| 
| align=center| 3
| align=center| 1:18
| Radom, Poland
|Middleweight debut.
|-
| Draw
| align=center| 
| Adrian Błeszyński
| Draw (split)
| Babilon MMA 12: Pawlak vs. Błeszyński
| 
| align=center| 5
| align=center| 5:00
| Łomża, Poland
| 
|-
| Win
| align=center| 15–4
| Evgeny Bondar
| Decision (split)
|ACA 96: Goncharov vs. Johnson
|
| align=center| 3
| align=center| 5:00
| Łódź, Poland
| 
|-
| Loss
| align=center| 14–4
| Daniel Skibiński
| Decision (unanimous)
| Babilon MMA 6: Pawlak vs. Skibiński
| 
| align=center| 5
| align=center| 5:00
| Raszyn, Poland
| 
|-
| Win
| align=center| 14–3
| Rafał Lewoń
| TKO (elbows)
| Babilon MMA 5: Skibiński vs. Melillo
| 
| align=center| 3
| align=center| 1:26
| Międzyzdroje, Poland
| 
|-
| Win
| align=center| 13–3
| Adam Niedźwiedź
| TKO (elbows)
| Babilon MMA 2: Koleck vs. Orkowski
| 
| align=center| 2
| align=center| 4:37
| Legionowo, Poland
|
|-
| Win
| align=center| 12–3
| Ireneusz Szydiowski
| Decision (unanimous)
| FEN 16: Warsaw Reloaded
| 
| align=center| 3
| align=center| 5:00
| Warsaw, Poland
| 
|-
| Loss
| align=center| 11–3
| Igor Fernandes
| Decision (unanimous)
| FEN 12: Feel The Force
| 
| align=center| 3
| align=center| 5:00
| Wroclaw, Poland
| 
|-
| Loss
| align=center| 11–2
| Leon Edwards
| Decision (unanimous)
| UFC Fight Night: Bisping vs. Leites
| 
| align=center| 3
| align=center| 5:00
| Glasgow, Scotland, United Kingdom
| 
|-
| Win
| align=center| 11–1
| Sheldon Westcott
| Decision (unanimous)
| UFC Fight Night: Gonzaga vs. Cro Cop 2
| 
| align=center| 3
| align=center| 5:00
| Kraków, Poland
| 
|-
| Loss
| align=center| 10–1
| Peter Sobotta
| Decision (unanimous)
| UFC Fight Night: Munoz vs. Mousasi 
| 
| align=center| 3
| align=center| 5:00
| Berlin, Germany
| 
|-
| Win
| align=center| 10–0
| Mateusz Strzelczyk
| TKO (elbows)
| MMAFC: MMA Fighters Club
| 
| align=center| 3
| align=center| 3:00
| Inowroclaw, Inowroclaw County, Poland
| 
|-
| Win
| align=center| 9–0
| Laszlo Soltesz
| TKO (corner stoppage)
| MTC: Fight Night 4
| 
| align=center| 1
| align=center| 5:00
| Miedzychod, Greater Poland Voivodeship, Poland
|
|-
| Win
| align=center| 8–0
| Szymon Nadobny
| Submission (inverted triangle choke)
| A: ArMMAgeddon 1
| 
| align=center| 1
| align=center| 4:03
| Stargard Szczecinski, Poland
|Catchweight bout (176 lb).
|-
| Win
| align=center| 7–0
| Artur Piotrowski
| TKO (punches)
| PLMMA 17 Extra: Warmia Heroes
| 
| align=center| 2
| align=center| 2:24
| Olsztyn, Warmian-Masurian, Poland
| 
|-
| Win
| align=center| 6–0
| Pawel Latalo
| TKO (elbows)
| FA 5: Home
| 
| align=center| 1
| align=center| 2:15
| Krasnik, Poland
| 
|-
| Win
| align=center| 5–0
| Shamil Ilyasov
| TKO (elbows)
| FAL 3: The Return
| 
| align=center| 2
| align=center| 1:32
| Łódź, Łódź Voivodeship, Poland
| 
|-
| Win
| align=center| 4–0
| Adam Golonkiewicz
| Submission (inverted triangle choke)
| XCage: Extreme Cage 4
| 
| align=center| 2
| align=center| 2:35
| Torun, Poland
| 
|-
| Win
| align=center| 3–0
| Matas Stebuliauskas
| TKO (punches)
| FAL 2: Fighters Arena Lodz 2
| 
| align=center| 2
| align=center| 3:48
| Łódź, Łódź Voivodeship, Poland
| 
|-
| Win
| align=center| 2–0
| Laszlo Acs
| Decision (unanimous)
| FAL 1: Nastula vs. Masuda
| 
| align=center| 2
| align=center| 5:00
| Łódź, Łódź Voivodeship, Poland
| 
|-
| Win
| align=center| 1–0
| Tomasz Krauze
| TKO (submission to punches)
| Strefa Walk: Krysztofiak vs. Bandel
| 
| align=center| 1
| align=center| 1:19
| Poznań, Greater Poland Voivodeship, Poland
|

See also
List of current KSW fighters
List of male mixed martial artists

References

External links
 
 
 
 UFC Fight Night 72 results: Head kick helps Leon Edwards past Pawel Pawlak at MMAjunkie.com
 Leon Edwards Controls Pawel Pawlak On Way To Victory at LowKickMMA.com
 UFC Fight Night 72 results: Leon Edwards earns unanimous decision over Pawel Pawlak at MMAmania.com
 

1989 births
Polish male mixed martial artists
Lightweight mixed martial artists
Welterweight mixed martial artists
Mixed martial artists utilizing kickboxing
Living people
Place of birth missing (living people)
Ultimate Fighting Championship male fighters